The  was a series of equipment failures, nuclear meltdowns, and releases of radioactive materials at the Fukushima I Nuclear Power Plant, following the Tōhoku earthquake and tsunami on 11 March 2011. It is the largest nuclear disaster since the Chernobyl disaster of 1986.

Context

11 March 2011 event
The plant comprises six separate boiling water reactors originally designed by General Electric (GE), and maintained by the Tokyo Electric Power Company (TEPCO). At the time of the quake, Reactor 4 had been de-fueled while 5 and 6 were in cold shutdown for planned maintenance. Immediately after the earthquake, the remaining reactors 1-3 shut down automatically, and emergency generators came online to control electronics and coolant systems. A tsunami following the earthquake flooded the low-lying rooms where emergency generators were housed. The flooded generators failed, cutting power to the critical pumps that circulate coolant water to keep them from melting down. When the pumps stopped, the reactors overheated due to the high radioactive decay heat produced in the first few days after nuclear reactor shutdown. As the water boiled away in the reactors and the water levels in the fuel rod pools dropped, the reactor fuel rods began to overheat severely. In the hours and days that followed, Reactors 1, 2 and 3 experienced full meltdown. In an attempt to halt a meltdown, the government ordered that seawater be used to cool the reactors, as no alternative was available at the time. Because of the delay in this process, meltdown progressed, depositing most of the melted fuel at the bottom of the reactor vessel.

The heat and pressure of the melting reactors, caused a reaction between the nuclear fuel metal cladding and the remaining water producing explosive hydrogen gas. As workers struggled to cool and shut down the reactors, several hydrogen-air chemical explosions occurred. Concerns about the repeated small explosions, the atmospheric venting of radioactive gasses, and the possibility of larger explosions led to a -radius evacuation around the plant. During the early days of the accident workers were temporarily evacuated at various times for radiation safety reasons. At the same time, sea water that had been exposed to the melting rods was returned to the sea heated and radioactive in large volumes for several months until recirculating units could be put in place to repeatedly cool and re-use a limited quantity of water for cooling. The earthquake damage and flooding in the wake of the tsunami hindered external assistance. Electrical power was slowly restored for some of the reactors, allowing for automated cooling.

Japanese officials initially assessed the accident as Level 4 on the International Nuclear Event Scale (INES) despite the views of other international agencies that it should be higher. The level was later raised to 5 and eventually to 7, the maximum scale value. The Japanese government and TEPCO have been criticized in the foreign press for poor communication with the public and improvised cleanup efforts. On 20 March, the Chief Cabinet Secretary Yukio Edano announced that the plant would be decommissioned once the crisis was over.

The Japanese government estimates the total amount of radioactivity released into the atmosphere was approximately one-tenth as much as was released during the Chernobyl disaster. Significant amounts of radioactive material have also been released into ground and ocean waters. Measurements taken by the Japanese government 30–50 km from the plant showed caesium-137 levels high enough to cause concern, leading the government to ban the sale of food grown in the area. Tokyo officials temporarily recommended that tap water should not be used to prepare food for infants. In May 2012, TEPCO reported that at least 900 PBq had been released "into the atmosphere in March last year [2011] alone" although it has been said staff may have been told to lie, and give false readings to try and cover up true levels of radiation.

On 16 December 2011, Japanese authorities declared the plant to be stable, although it would take decades to decontaminate the surrounding areas and to decommission the plant altogether. On 5 July 2012, the parliament appointed The Fukushima Nuclear Accident Independent Investigation Commission (NAIIC) submitted its inquiry report to the Japanese parliament, while the government appointed Investigation Committee on the Accident at the Fukushima Nuclear Power Stations of Tokyo Electric Power Company submitted its final report to the Japanese government on 23 July 2012. Tepco admitted for the first time on 12 October 2012 that it had failed to take stronger measures to prevent disasters for fear of inviting lawsuits or protests against its nuclear plants.

The highest level of radiation released by reactor #2 was recorded on 2 February 2017, at 730 Sieverts per hour.

Effects on workers and local residents
A few of the plant's workers were severely injured or killed by the disaster conditions resulting from the earthquake. There were no immediate deaths due to direct radiation exposures, but at least six workers have exceeded lifetime legal limits for radiation and more than 300 have received significant radiation doses. Predicted future cancer cases due to accumulated radiation exposures in the population living near Fukushima have ranged from no deaths to 100 cancer cases to a non-peer-reviewed "guesstimate" of 1,000 cancer deaths.

Unit 2 reactor

Unit 2 was operating at the time of the earthquake and experienced the same controlled initial shutdown as the other units. As with unit 1, the reactor scrammed following the earthquake. The two diesel generators came online and initially all cooling systems were available. Initially the high pressure coolant injection (HPCI) system was primary cooling the core and at 15:00 operators activated the residual heat removal system main pump and the containment vessel spray pump at 15:07 to cool the suppression pool; all these systems failed following both AC power and DC power loss after the tsunami as the diesel generators and other systems failed when the tsunami overran the plant. The reactor core isolation cooling (RCIC) system was manually activated by operators at 15:39 following power loss, but by midnight the status of the reactor was unclear; some monitoring equipment was still operating on temporary power. The coolant level was stable and preparations were underway to reduce pressure in the reactor containment vessel should it become necessary, though TEPCO did not state in press releases what these preparations were, and the government had been advised that this might happen. The RCIC was reported by TEPCO to have shut down around 19:00 JST on 12 March, but reported to be operating again as of 09:00 JST 13 March. The pressure reduction of the reactor containment vessel commenced before midnight on 12 March although the IAEA reported that as of 13:15 JST 14 March, that according to information supplied to them, no venting had taken place at the plant. A report in The New York Times suggested that plant officials initially concentrated efforts on a damaged fuel storage pool at Unit 2, diverting attention from problems arising at the other reactors, but that incident was not reported in official press releases. The IAEA reported that on 14 March at 09:30, the RCIC was still operating and that power was being provided by a mobile generator.
By midday on 19 March grid power had been connected to the existing transformer at Unit 2 and work continued to connect the transformer to the new distribution panel installed in a nearby building. Outside electricity became available at 15:46 JST on 20 March, but equipment still had to be repaired and reconnected.

Cooling problems
On 14 March, TEPCO reported the shutdown of the RCIC system presumably due to low reactor pressure. Operators had for days taken measures to prevent the reactor pressure from dropping below the level at which the RCIC can operate to keep it running as long as possible. The system was never designed to be used for an extended period. Fuel rods had been fully exposed for 140 minutes and there was a risk of a core meltdown. Reactor water level indicators were reported to be showing minimum-possible values at 19:30 JST on 14 March.

At 22:29 JST, workers had succeeded in refilling half the reactor with water but parts of the rods were still exposed, and technicians could not rule out the possibility that some had melted. It was hoped that holes blown in the walls of reactor building 2 by the earlier blast from Unit 3 would allow the escape of hydrogen vented from the reactor and prevent a similar explosion. At 21:37 JST, the measured dose rates at the gate of the plant reached a maximum of 3.13 m Sv/h, which was enough to reach the annual limit for non-nuclear workers in twenty minutes, but had fallen back to 0.326 mSv/h by 22:35.

It was believed that around 23:00 JST, the 4 m long fuel rods in the reactor were fully exposed for the second time. At 00:30 JST on 15 March, NHK ran a live press conference with TEPCO stating that the water level had sunk under the rods once again and pressure in the vessel was raised. The utility said that the hydrogen explosion at Unit 3 might have caused a glitch in the cooling system of Unit 2: Four out of five water pumps being used to cool the Unit 2 reactor had failed after the explosion at Unit 3. In addition, the last pump had briefly stopped working when its fuel ran out. To replenish the water, the contained pressure would have to be lowered first by opening a valve of the vessel. The unit's air flow gauge was accidentally turned off and, with the gauge turned off, flow of water into the reactor was blocked leading to full exposure of the rods. As of 04:11 JST on 15 March, water was being pumped into the reactor of Unit 2 again.

At Thursday 23 June Tepco-workers entered the building of reactor 2, to install a provisional gauge for measuring the water level inside the reactor. The original device was damaged in March. Next Saturday 25 June Tepco reported, that it was still not possible to obtain accurate data on the water level and pressure of this reactor. The temperature near the containment vessel is very high, because of this the gauge did not function properly: the water inside the tubes of the gauge was evaporated.

It was later revealed that workers were minutes from restoring power to the standby liquid control (SLC) system pumps in unit 2 as a way to inject borated water once the RCIC shut down and had spent hours laying cable from a generator truck to the unit 2 power center when the unit 1 explosion occurred. This damaged the cable preventing this method from being used. It is possible this system could have prevented a complete meltdown as it took hours after the explosion until injection using fire trucks could be started.

Explosion
An explosion was heard after 06:14 JST on 15 March in Unit 2, possibly damaging the pressure-suppression system at the bottom part of the containment vessel. The radiation level was reported as exceeding the legal limit, and the plant's operator started to evacuate all non-essential workers from the plant. Only a minimum crew of 50 men, also referred to as the Fukushima 50, was left at the site. Soon after, radiation equivalent dose rates had risen to 8.2 mSv/h around two hours after the explosion and again down to 2.4 mSv/h, shortly after. Three hours after the explosion, the rates had risen to 11.9 mSv/h.

While admitting that the suppression pool at the bottom of the containment vessel had been damaged in the explosion, causing a drop of pressure there, Japanese nuclear authorities emphasized that the containment had not been breached as a result of the explosion and contained no obvious holes. In a news conference on 15 March the director general of the IAEA, Yukiya Amano, said that there was a "possibility of core damage" at Unit 2 of less than 5%. Japan's Nuclear and Industrial Safety Agency (NISA) stated 33% of the fuel rods were damaged, in news reports the morning of 16 March. On 30 March, NISA reiterated concerns about a possible Unit 2 breach at either the suppression pool, or the reactor vessel. NHK World reported the NISA's concerns as "air may be leaking", very probably through "weakened valves, pipes and openings under the reactors where the control rods are inserted", but that "there is no indication of large cracks or holes in the reactor vessels".

On 8 November workers did enter reactor-building no. 4, and inspected the place to determine the cause of the hydrogen-blast on 15 March 2011. They found the 5th floor more severely damaged compared with the 4th floor, where the spent fuel pool was located. The fuel itself was found undamaged. The workers also found a severely damaged air conditioning duct on floor 5. These findings did not support earlier assumptions that the hydrogen in the blast originated from the spent fuel pool of reactor 4, but instead proved that the explosion was caused by hydrogen from the number 3 reactor, after the valves were opened. The hydrogen reached the fifth floor of reactor building 4 through the aforementioned damaged air conditioning duct.

Spent fuel pool
From 20 March, seawater was added to the spent fuel pool via the Fuel Pool Cooling (FPC) line. Fresh water was used from 29 March.

On 31 May, the spent fuel pool was switched from the water-injection system, to a circulatory cooling system.

Containment damage
Unit 2 was considered the most likely unit to have a damaged reactor containment vessel, as of 24 March. But images from a robotic inspection reveal superficial surface damage to pipework but show the outer surface of the torus to be in normal condition and the potential break points of the manhole covers intact.
On 27 March, TEPCO reported measurements of very high radiation levels, over 1000 mSv/h, in the basement of the Unit 2 turbine building, which officials reported was 10 million times higher than what would be found in the water of a normally functioning reactor. Hours into the media frenzy, the company retracted its report and stated that the figures were not credible. "because the level was so high the worker taking the reading had to evacuate before confirming it with a second reading." Shortly following the ensuing wave of media retractions that discredited the report worldwide, TEPCO clarified its initial retraction; the radiation from the pool surface in the basement of the Unit 2 turbine building was found to be "more than 1,000 millisieverts per hour", as originally reported, but the concentration of radioactive substances was 100,000 times higher than usual, not 10 million.

Seawater used for cooling
At 20:05 JST on 14 March, the Japanese government ordered seawater to be injected into Unit 2 in a new effort to cool the reactor core. The treatment had been held as a last resort since it ruins the reactor. TEPCO started seawater cooling at 16:34. From 26 March, freshwater was used to cool the core.

Reactor stabilization
By 26 March 2011, electrical power (initially from temporary sources, off-site power starting 3 April) was restored to parts of the Unit, with the Main Control Room lighting being restored.

On 28 March, the Nuclear Safety Commission announced its suspicion that radioactive materials had leaked from Unit 2 into water in trenches connecting Unit 2's buildings, leading TEPCO to reduce the amount of water pumped into the reactor because of fears that the water could leak into the sea. The reduction in water pumping could have raised reactor temperatures.

On 27 March, the IAEA reported temperatures at the bottom of the Reactor Pressure Vessel (RPV) at Unit 2 fell to 97 °C (206.6 °F) from 100 °C (212 °F) on Saturday. Operators attempted to pump water from the turbine hall basement to the condenser, but "both condensers turned out to be full." Therefore, condenser water was first attempted to be pumped to storage tanks, freeing condenser storage for water currently in the basement of Unit 2. The pumps now being used can move 10 to 25 tons of water per hour. On 19 April 2011, TEPCO began transferring excess radioactive cooling water from the reactor's basement and maintenance tunnels to a waste processing facility.

On 18 April, remote control robot was used to enter the Reactor Building and performed a series of inspections.

On 18 May, staff entered the Reactor Building for the first time since 15 March.

On 11 June, ventilation systems were installed in the Reactor Building, to clean the highly radioactive air encapsulated within the Reactor Building.

On 28 June, TEPCO began injecting nitrogen into the containment vessel, which was expected to reduce the likelihood of further hydrogen explosions.

Since 2 July, the Reactor has been cooled using fresh water treated by the on site water treatment plant.

On 14 September at 11AM (JST) TEPCO began injecting water into the No. 2 reactor using the core spray system piping in addition to the feed water piping already being used as this method seemed to be effective in reducing the temperature in the No. 3 reactor. At that time the temperature at the bottom of the No. 2 reactor was still 114.4 degrees Celsius (237.92 °F), compared to the 84.9 °C degrees(184.82 °F) in the No.1 reactor and the 101.3 °C (214.34 °F) in the No. 3 reactor. The new method has led to some temperature decrease, but not as significant as the decrease that occurred in the No.3 reactor.

After some positive effect was noticed using both the core spray system and feed water piping, TEPCO decided on 16 September to increase the amount of water pumped into the No. 2 reactor by one ton, in an attempt to further lower the temperature in the core, to a total of 7 tons per hour. The same was done for reactor No. 3, where 5 tons were added, bring the total to 12 tons per hour. TEPCO also added that the volume of cooling water into the No. 1 reactor would be increased as necessary.

On 21 September 2011, Masanori Naitoh, director in charge of nuclear safety analysis at the Institute of Applied Energy, an expert commenting on the plan to contain the crisis at the Fukushima Daiichi nuclear plant, mentioned that the interior temperatures of the damaged reactors had to be checked to confirm cold-shutdown. Naitoh said that TEPCO was only measuring temperatures outside the reactors, and that the temperatures inside should be confirmed through simulation to confirm that they had fallen below 100 degrees, and that there were no risks of nuclear reactions recurring.

In the first week of February 2012, temperatures inside reactor No. 2 became unstable. On 7 February, the amount of cooling water was increased from 10.5 tons to 13.5 tons per hour. After a slight initial decrease in temperature, sensor readings again showed the temperature rising at some locations in the bottom of the reactor. On 11 February, temperatures rose once again. On 12 February, the temperature rose to 78.3 °C (172.94 °F). TEPCO denied the possibility of the core going critical again, because that would produce xenon, which was still below detectable levels. To prevent any possible nuclear criticality, TEPCO planned to dump boric acid into the reactor and to increase the volume of cooling water by 3 tons per hour.

Since only one of the temperature-sensors showed fluctuating readings between 70 °C and 90 °C, TEPCO and NISA thought this sensor was malfunctioning. The sensor works on the principle of changing resistance between the surface of two different metals as the temperature changes. TEPCO planned measurements on this sensor. Since the radiation around reactor 2 could make it impossible to place new sensors inside the reactor vessel, the situation would become very serious if the other two sensors inside the reactor were to also fail. After that, it would be impossible to monitor the reactor. Kazuhiko Kudo, a professor of nuclear engineering at the university of Kyushu, Japan commented: "Because we haven't been able to grasp how the nuclear fuel in the cores has been distributed, it's impossible to rule out localized high temperature spots. As the high radiation rules out installing new temperature sensors, if the last two sensors fail, the situation will be much more serious indeed." On 26 February, TEPCO sent a report to the Japanese government about the malfunctioning temperature-sensors and has since ceased monitoring that sensor. The other two temperature-sensors and the radiation levels inside the containment vessel would be used to monitor the state of the cold shutdown. The amount of cooling water would be lowered, after NISA's approval.

On 15 April 2012, one of the two remaining temperature-sensors at the bottom of the No.2 reactor gave false readings, and because the electric resistance was found greatly increased, TEPCO concluded that it was broken, leaving only 18 of 36 temperature sensors still functioning. At 11 a.m., the remaining thermometer at this place measured 46.7 degrees Celsius.

On 1 June 2012 TEPCO reported that another thermometer had malfunctioned, resulting in more than half of the temperature sensors, 23 out of 41, now being out of use in reactor No. 2., thus making it more problematic to monitor the state of "cold-shutdown". According to TEPCO, the high humidity in the reactor may be a contributing factor in the failure of the sensors. TEPCO stated that it is currently decontaminating the site and training workers to install new thermometers. The plan is to install new thermometers through pipes that are connected to the reactor. TEPCO stated that it plans to decontaminate the site and install the new thermometers by late July 2012.

On 15 June 2012 TEPCO reported that a robot that was sent into the No. 2 reactor building on 13 June 2012 to take video images and radiation measurements, detected a reading of 880mSv (millisieverts) per hour of radiation on the fifth floor, which one floor (4.5 meters) directly above the reactor containment vessel. TEPCO suspects that during initial accident in March 2011, that radioactive substances leaked from the No. 2 reactor moved through the building, but after analyzing the images taken by the robot it could not find the exact route the radioactive substances traveled, and images taken by the robot found no major damage on the fifth floor. During the March 2011 nuclear accident the No. 2 reactor is believed to have released the largest amount of radioactive substances. But the overall route the radioactive material traveled has yet to be determined. TEPCO needs to find and repair the damaged parts of the reactor to recover melted nuclear fuel before TEPCO can begin the process of decommissioning the reactor. However high radiation often stops workers from entering the building. This scenario means it will take a long time to find the problems in the containment vessel.

On 3 October 2012 TEPCO installed a new temperature-sensor inside reactor nr.2. The thermometer showed 42.6 degrees Celsius, another nearby the RPV bottom monitoring instrument (TE-2-3-69H3) indicated 46.1 degrees. At that moment only 1 out of the existing 5 sensors was functioning properly.

Pressure vessel damage
On 15 May, TEPCO revealed that the pressure vessel that holds nuclear fuel "is likely to be damaged and leaking water at Units 2 and 3", which means most of the thousands of tons of water pumped into the reactors had leaked.

Meltdown
On 29 March, Richard Lahey, former head of safety research for boiling-water reactors at General Electric, speculated that the reactor core may have melted through the reactor containment vessel onto a concrete floor, raising concerns of a major release of radioactive material, while failing to divulge the report by Dale G. Bridenbaugh which condemned the design as "unsafe". On 27 April, TEPCO revised its estimate of damaged fuel in Unit 2 from 30% to 35%.
TEPCO reported on 23 May that Reactor 2 suffered a meltdown about 100 hours after the earthquake.

Concerns over re-criticality

On 1 November 2011 TEPCO said that xenon-133 and xenon-135 were detected in gas-samples taken from the containment vessel of reactor 2, in a concentration of 6 to 10 (or more) parts per million becquerels per cubic centimeter. Xenon-135 was also detected in gas samples collected on 2 November. These isotopes are the result of nuclear fission-reaction of uranium. Because the short half-lives of these gases: (Xe-133: 5 days Xe-135: 9 hours), the presence could only mean that nuclear fissions were occurring at some places in the reactor. Boric-acid was poured into the reactor in an attempt to stop the fission-reactions. No significant change in temperature or pressure was found by TEPCO, so there was no sign of large-scale criticality. The reactor-cooling was continued, but TEPCO would examine the situation at reactor 1 and 3 also. Professor Koji Okamoto of the University of Tokyo Graduate School made the comment that localized and temporary fission might still happen, and that the melted fuel could undergo fission, but the fuel was probably scattered around. Neutrons from radioactive materials could react with the uranium fuel and other substances. Self-sustaining chain reactions were unlikely, thanks to the huge amounts of boric acid that were poured into the reactor.
According to Okamoto, these neutrons should be closely monitored to make sure fission did not happen, because when the fission-reactions were not controlled, it would be impossible to reach a state of "cold-shutdown". Therefore, it was needed to locate all molten fuel in and outside the reactor-vessel.

On 3 November 2011 TEPCO said that the tiny amounts of xenon-135 detected in the reactor's containment vessel atmosphere came from spontaneous nuclear fission with curium-242 and curium-244, substances that were present in the nuclear fuel. A critical fission would have caused much higher concentrations of xenon isotopes. These reactions would occur constantly, and did not lead to criticality in the melted fuel of reactor 2. All assessments would be sent to NISA for reevaluation.

The detection of xenon on the afternoon of 1 November by TEPCO was reported to NISA in the night. The next day, 2 November just past 7 a.m., NISA informed the Prime Minister Yoshihiko Noda's secretary about the possibility of critical reactions in reactor 2. Two hours later at 9 a.m. prime minister Edano learned the news. At a press-conference, the Chief Cabinet Secretary Osamu Fujimura revealed that Minister of Economy, Trade and Industry Yukio Edano sent a strong reprimand to Hiroyuki Fukano, the chief of NISA, because NISA failed to report the incident immediately to both himself and the Prime Minister's Office, and that NISA waited almost a day after the find was done. Fujimura said, "I have been told that NISA decided not to report the incident until the following morning because the agency didn't believe it was a dangerous situation."

Radioactive pollution of groundwater
On 27 July 2013 was announced that extremely high levels of tritium and cesium were found in a pit containing about 5000 cubic meters of water on the seaside of the unit 2 reactor building. 8.7 million becquerels/liter Tritium was found and 2.35 billion becquerels/liter cesium. The NRA was concerned that leaks from this place could cause the high tritium levels in sea, and that there was still water flowing from the reactor into the turbine building into the pit. But TEPCO thought that this pollution was there from the first days in 2011, and stayed there. Nevertheless, TEPCO would control the site for leaks, and seal the soil around the pit.

2017 Investigation of unit 2's containment in relation to elevated levels of radiation

On 30 January, TEPCO inserted a camera into the unit 2 containment system to investigate the region underneath the reactor vessel. TEPCO was able to estimate radiation levels of 530 Sv/hr, the highest level measured since the March 2011 accident when the previous high was measured at 73 Sv/hr. This does not represent an increase in radiation at the reactor, but rather is the first measurement taken in the containment vessel at this location. This investigation provided visual evidence that the core melt partially breached the reactor vessel. A 1x1 meter hole in the grating of the undervessel Control Rod Drive inspection platform was identified along with various deposits of core debris and sediment. TEPCO is using this information to help plan an upcoming robot entry to the under-vessel region of the concrete-floored containment. These radiation levels are indicative of the presence of corium.

See also
 List of civilian nuclear accidents
 Lists of nuclear disasters and radioactive incidents
 Timeline of the Fukushima Daiichi nuclear disaster
 Comparison of Fukushima and Chernobyl nuclear accidents

References

External links
 The Fukushima Nuclear Accident Independent Investigation Commission Report website in English
 Executive summary of the Fukushima Nuclear Accident Independent Investigation Commission Report
 Fukushima report: Key points in nuclear disaster report - An outline of key quotes, findings and recommendations from the 88-page executive summary of the Nuclear Accident Independent Investigation Commission's report, as provided by the BBC, 5 July 2012
 Webcam Fukushima nuclear power plant I, Unit 1 through Unit 4
 Investigation Committee on the accidents at the Fukushima Nuclear Power Station of Tokyo Electric Power Company
 TEPCO News Releases, Tokyo Electric Power Company
 NISA Information update, Nuclear and Industrial Safety Agency, the nuclear safety authority of Japan
 JAIF Information update, Japan Atomic International Forum
 JAEA Information update, Japan Atomic Energy Agency
 IAEA Update on Japan Earthquake, International Atomic Energy Agency
 Nature Journal – Specials: Japan earthquake and nuclear crisis
 TerraFly Timeline Aerial Imagery of Fukushima Nuclear Reactor after 2011 Tsunami and Earthquake
 Documentary photographs: residential damage within "No Go" Zone
 In graphics: Fukushima nuclear alert, as provided by the BBC, 9 July 2012
 PreventionWeb Japan: 2011 Fukushima Daiichi nuclear disaster 
 "What should we learn from the severe accident at the Fukushima Dai-ichi Nuclear Power Plant?" by Kenichi Ohmae, Team H2O Project. 28 October 2011

Fukushima Daiichi nuclear disaster